Gashau Ayale (born 22 August 1996) is an Ethiopian-born Israeli long-distance runner.

Athletics career
In May of 2022, Ayale set a national record in the 10,000 metres running 27:49.88 to become the first Israeli to break 28 minutes in the event. A few months later in August, he won the bronze medal for the marathon at the European Athletics Championships held in Munich.

Personal life
Ayale has a younger brother, Yehuda Darba Ayala, who holds Israel's national U23 5000 metres record.

Personal bests
 3000 metres – 8:05.64 (Tel Aviv 2020)
 5000 metres – 13:56.37 (Tel Aviv 2022)
 10,000 metres – 27:49.88 (London 2022) 
Road
 10 kilometres – 29:23 (Hod HaSharon 2018)
 Half marathon – 1:02:38 (Tiberias 2022)
 Marathon – 2:05:33 (Seville 2023)

References

External links
 
Gashau Ayale at worldathletics.org

Israeli male marathon runners
Israeli male long-distance runners
Living people
1996 births
European Athletics Championships medalists